The Bürgl Hut is a private mountain hut at  in the Kitzbühel Alps in the Austrian federal state of Salzburg.

The formerly self-catering hut is today partially managed (ca. 20 beds and 25 mattress places) and is found on the southern slopes of the Geißstein (2,363 m), 5 km north of Mittersill and 7 km east of the Thurn Pass.

The Alpine hut lies at the head of the Mühlbach valley, that runs up from the Salzach valley near Uttendorf/Stuhlfelden. 
The climb to the hut from Stuhlfelden takes 2–3 hours, but the track to the hut is also open to bicycles or motor vehicles. The approach from Hinterglemm takes somewhat longer.

The hut is and important base for the so-called Pinzgau Ridgeway (Pinzgauer Spaziergang), a popular mountain trail. The climb from the hut to the Geißstein takes about 2 hours.

Crossings 
 Pinzgau Hut 6–7 hours (east)
 Wildkogelhaus 5–6 hours
 Bochumer Hut (also Kelchalpenhaus) 4 hours

References

Sources, external links 
 Freytag-Berndt "Kitzbühler Alpen" 1:100.000 and short guide
 Österr. Karte 1:50.000, Bürglhütte and Geißstein

Mountain huts in Austria
Buildings and structures in Salzburg (state)